Deoxyhypusine synthase (spermidine:eIF5A-lysine 4-aminobutyltransferase (propane-1,3-diamine-forming)) is an enzyme with systematic name (eIF5A-precursor)-lysine:spermidine 4-aminobutyltransferase (propane-1,3-diamine-forming). This enzyme catalyses the following chemical reaction

 [eIF5A-precursor]-lysine + spermidine  [eIF5A-precursor]-deoxyhypusine + propane-1,3-diamine (overall reaction)
 (1a) spermidine + NAD+  dehydrospermidine + NADH
 (1b) dehydrospermidine + [enzyme]-lysine  N-(4-aminobutylidene)-[enzyme]-lysine + propane-1,3-diamine
 (1c) N-(4-aminobutylidene)-[enzyme]-lysine + [eIF5A-precursor]-lysine  N-(4-aminobutylidene)-[eIF5A-precursor]-lysine + [enzyme]-lysine
 (1d) N-(4-aminobutylidene)-[eIF5A-precursor]-lysine + NADH + H+  [eIF5A-precursor]-deoxyhypusine + NAD+

The eukaryotic initiation factor eIF5A contains a hypusine residue that is essential for activity.

References

External links 

EC 2.5.1